Rickwood Field, located in Birmingham, Alabama, is the oldest professional baseball park in the United States. It was built for the Birmingham Barons in 1910 by industrialist and team-owner Rick Woodward and has served as the home park for the Birmingham Barons and the Birmingham Black Barons of the Negro leagues. Though the Barons moved their home games to the Hoover Met in the suburbs, and most recently to Regions Field in Birmingham, Rickwood Field has been preserved and is undergoing gradual restoration as a "working museum" where baseball's history can be experienced. The Barons also play one regular season game a year at Rickwood Field.  Rickwood Field is listed on the National Register of Historic Places.

History
The Birmingham Coal Barons baseball team began playing professionally in 1887, with their home games at an informal park called "Slag Pile Field" in West End. In 1901 they joined the Southern Association.

Allen Harvey "Rick" Woodward, chairman of Woodward Iron Company and grandson of pioneer Birmingham industrialist Stimpson Harvey Woodward, purchased a majority share of the Birmingham Coal Barons baseball team from J. William McQueen in 1909 while he was still in his 20s. Immediately he began planning a grand showplace for his new team. He contacted Connie Mack for advice on the details, including the field dimensions. He settled on Shibe Park in Philadelphia (which was controlled by Mack's team and later renamed Connie Mack Stadium) and Forbes Field in Pittsburgh as the models for the new park. He purchased land in the West End neighborhood of Birmingham from the Alabama Central Railroad. The $75,000 structure was designed by Southeastern Engineering Company of Birmingham (a short-lived subsidiary of Pittsburgh's General Fireproofing Company) and completed during the summer of 1910. The 12.7 acre (51,000 m2) park was flanked along the basepaths by concrete and steel stands. A tile-roofed cupola on the roof behind home plate provided space for the announcer and the press. Woodward named the field after himself, using his nickname and the first part of his last name.  It was the first concrete-and-steel stadium in the minors.

Woodward invited Alabama Governor Braxton Bragg Comer, Birmingham Mayor Culpepper Exum, civic leader, George B. Ward and Victor H. Hanson, publisher of The Birmingham News, for opening day on August 18, 1910. The day was celebrated by businesses closing all over town to allow fans to fill the park for the first pitch at 3:30 P.M. Over 10,000 people attended that first game in which the Barons defeated the visiting Montgomery Climbers 3–2. Throughout the first half of the 20th century Rickwood Field hosted sellout crowds for both the Barons and the Black Barons, who played on alternate weekends.

In 1912 a spring tornado tore through the field, pulling up the outfield fence. Two years later Woodward felt the need to have electric fans installed in the grandstands for the comfort of the crowd. The Pittsburgh Pirates also made Rickwood Field their spring training home in 1919.

Rickwood Field also hosted college football games. From 1912 to 1927 the Alabama Crimson Tide played its Birmingham home dates in Rickwood.  In 1921 the outfield fence was damaged in a tornado and quickly rebuilt. In 1924–1927 the infield bleachers were covered with a steel-framed roof designed by Denham, VanKeuren & Denham, Architects of Birmingham. Shortly after, In 1928 a new Mission style entry structure with offices was built to the designs of Paul Wright & Co., Engineers of Birmingham. A new concrete outfield wall replaced the original fence.

In 1931 in the first game of the Dixie Series championship, Birmingham's 43-year-old Ray Caldwell outpitched 22-year-old Dizzy Dean, who had guaranteed a win. The Barons won the series 4 games to 3. In 1936 four monumental steel-frame light towers designed and fabricated by the Truscon Steel Company of Youngstown, Ohio were erected, allowing for night games. In 1938, Woodward sold the park to Ed Norton, a local businessman. In 1940 Norton sold it to the Cincinnati Reds. At that time new outfield fences were built inside the original walls to reduce the field dimensions.  G. J. Jebeles of Birmingham purchased the park in 1944. A ladies' rest room was added and the outfield fence reduced again in 1948. In 1949 ownership changed hands again, going to a partnership of Al DeMent, Al Belcher, and Rufus Lackey. They added a small restaurant in the entrance building in 1950 and installed additional box seats, necessitating the relocations of the dugouts farther down the baselines. In 1958 Belcher gained a majority share and control of the park. In 1964 General Manager Glynn West purchased 1000 wooden seats from New York City's Polo Grounds and installed them at the park. Belcher sold Rickwood Field in 1966 to the City of Birmingham, but retained a lease for the remainder of that year.

In 1966 the lease was transferred to Charlie Finley, who brought the Kansas City Athletics' AA farm team to Birmingham for the 1967 season. That year is remembered for the day that 14,000 disappointed fans were sent home early when the Atlanta Braves vs. Southern League All-Stars exhibition game was called "on account of tornado."  During this period, following a trend which swept minor league baseball (and which has since been largely reversed), the team took the name of the parent major league club and was known as the "Birmingham A's". Between 1979 and 1980 the wooden seats were replaced with plastic seats in the box areas and metal bleachers under the grandstands.

In 1981 Art Clarkson brought minor league baseball back to Rickwood with the Detroit Tigers AA club, which resumed the Barons name. He had a new electronic scoreboard installed at the park. In 1986, the Barons became the Chicago White Sox AA club, an affiliation that continues today.

In 1987 the Barons moved to a new facility, Hoover Metropolitan Stadium, in the suburb of Hoover.  They returned to Birmingham in 2013 with the opening of Regions Field, just south of downtown Birmingham.

Current status
Since 1992 the ballpark has been under the care of the Friends of Rickwood who are restoring the facility to its former glory. They also host frequent amateur, police and semi-pro games and open the gates to visitors who can walk in and explore the grandstands or run the bases.

Since 1996, Rickwood Field has hosted the Barons for a throwback game in which both teams wear period uniforms. Each game honors a different era in Birmingham baseball history. Ballpark enthusiasts from across North America migrate to Rickwood to attend this AA regulation game, named the "Rickwood Classic", every season. Many consider this game the best opportunity to experience a regulation ballgame in an historic ballpark that remains true to its original and traditional appearance. Those involved – the Barons franchise, Friends of Rickwood, and fans – fully believe that this experience in the sacred baseball cathedral is among the most underrated baseball events.

The ballpark was used by several film productions which contributed to the recreation of the scoreboard and press-box and the addition of 1940s period style advertisements on the outfield fence. Some of these retro-style ads have been sponsored by real Birmingham businesses, including a section sponsored by the descendants of Rick Woodward that advertises long-gone Woodward Iron Co. The outfield signs were designed by Ted Haigh, a Los Angeles-based graphic designer and executed by Skidmore Sign Company of Birmingham.

As of 2005, the Friends of Rickwood have spent around $2 million refurbishing the grandstands, press-box, locker rooms, roof and main entrance to the park. Future plans include establishing a Museum of Southern Baseball.

Since 2011 Play at the Plate Baseball has held an annual 3 day adult baseball tournament with 4 teams from various regions of the country participating. The event is usually held in June.

ESPN Classic broadcast a re-enactment of a Negro league game played at Rickwood on February 26, 2006. It featured teams wearing the uniforms of the fictitious "Bristol Barnstormers" (named for ESPN's hometown of Bristol, Connecticut) and the Birmingham Black Barons.

Rickwood Field is also home to the Miles College baseball team.

Popular culture

The ballpark was used for scenes in the film biopics of Jackie Robinson (42) and Ty Cobb (Cobb). The 1995 movie Soul of the Game features the park. The field is mentioned in the Willie Mays documentary, Say Hey, Willie Mays!, while detailing Mays' earlier professional career with the Birmingham Black Barons.

Gallery

See also

 Labatt Park in London, Ontario, recognized as the "oldest continually operating baseball grounds in the world".
 Warren Ballpark in Bisbee, Arizona, the grounds hosted professional baseball in 1909, but the present stadium dates to the 1930s.

References

Wainwright, Paige. "Rickwood Field: Grand Old Lady of Baseball." Alabama Heritage, Fall 1995.

United States Geological Survey (2006). . Retrieved 1 February 2006.

External links

 Rickwood Field (Friends of Rickwood) website
 Rickwood Field at Baseball Pilgrimages.com
 
 Rickwood Field Views - Ball Parks of the Minor Leagues

Baseball museums and halls of fame
Defunct college football venues
Minor league baseball venues
Negro league baseball venues
Alabama Crimson Tide football venues
Samford Bulldogs football
Pittsburgh Pirates spring training venues
Philadelphia Phillies spring training venues
International Sports Heritage Association
National Register of Historic Places in Birmingham, Alabama
Properties on the Alabama Register of Landmarks and Heritage
Museums in Birmingham, Alabama
Sports venues in Birmingham, Alabama
Negro league baseball venues still standing
Baseball venues in Alabama
Sports museums in Alabama
Historic American Buildings Survey in Alabama
1910 establishments in Alabama
Sports venues completed in 1910